Once Upon a Time in Yokohama ~B'z Live Gym'99 "Brotherhood"~ is the fourth live VHS released by Japanese rock duo B'z. It was later released on DVD, on March 14, 2001. It features live footage of the Brotherhood Live Gym Tour, one of their famous Live Gym Tours.

It is also the first B'z concert video to include "Live Gym" in the title, although previous releases were officially considered Live Gym shows.

Track listing 

F・E・A・R
Liar！ Liar！
Home
Time
Easy Come, Easy Go！
Nagai Ai (ながい愛)
Gin no Tsubasa de Tobe (銀の翼で翔べ)
Skin
Shine
TookuMade (遠くまで)
Go Further
Calling
Freeway Jam
Real Thing Shakes
Love Phantom
Samayoeru Aoi Dangan (さまよえる蒼い弾丸)
Zero
One
Run
Bad Communication
Brotherhood
Suima-Yo! ~from B'z Live-GYM'98 "Survive"~ (Bonus Track) (スイマーよ！~from B'z Live-GYM'98 "SURVIVE"~(Bonus Track))

External links 
B'z Official Website 

B'z video albums
2000 video albums